The 1964 Eastern Michigan Hurons football team represented Eastern Michigan University in the Presidents' Athletic Conference (PAC) during the 1964 NCAA College Division football season. In their 13th season under head coach Fred Trosko, the Hurons compiled a 4–3 record (3–2 against PAC opponents) and were outscored by their opponents, 110 to 73.

Trosko had success as the team's coach in the 1950s, but the program suffered a 29-game winless streak (0–27–2) from 1959 to 1962. The program's decline followed the decision of the Eastern Michigan administration not to award athletic scholarships. Competing with non-scholarship athletes against schools with scholarship athletes, Trosko's Eastern Michigan teams were unable to compete.  In August 1965, Trosko abruptly quit as the school's head football coach, and it was reported that the resignation was the result of "an apparent break with school administrators over policy."

Schedule

References

Eastern Michigan
Eastern Michigan Eagles football seasons
Eastern Michigan Hurons football